Joel Deane (born 1969) is an Australian poet, novelist, and speechwriter.

Bibliography

Non-fiction
 Catch and Kill: The Politics of Power (UQP, 2015)

Fiction
 Another (IP, 2004) 
 The Norseman's Song (Hunter, 2010)

Poetry
 Subterranean Radio Songs Interactive Publications (2005) .
 10 Pound Poems, Picaro Press (2007) .
 Magisterium, Australian Scholarly Publishing, 2008. .
 Year of the Wasp, Hunter Publishers (2016)

Book reviews

References

External links
 Interview with Joel Deane
 Review of Another in API Review of Books

1969 births
Living people
21st-century Australian novelists
Australian male novelists
Australian poets
Writers from Melbourne
Australian male poets
Australian Book Review people
21st-century Australian male writers